The Luffy robberies were a series of robberies in Japan which took place in 2021 and 2022. They have been linked to the alias "Luffy", are suspected to have been organised by detainees based in the Philippines. In 2023, four Japanese nationals were deported back to Japan over their suspected involvement in the Luffy robberies.

Background

2019 Makati hotel arrests
The Luffy robberies are linked back to the arrest of 36 Japanese nationals in a hotel in Makati over running a telecom fraud and extortion scheme. The detained individuals were deported between 2020 and 2021.

Suspects
The Luffy robberies has been masterminded by an individual operating under the alias "Luffy", after Monkey D. Luffy, the protagonist of the Japanese manga series One Piece. Japanese and Philippine media reports has named Yuki Watanabe to be "Luffy", but authorities in the Philippines has not confirmed this, leaving it up for their Japanese counterparts to confirm the identity the individual behind "Luffy".

Yuki Watanabe is detained at the Bureau of Immigration Bicutan Detention Center. He has been detained since April 19, 2021 and has been a subject of a summary deportation order since May 28, 2021. However his deportation has been placed on hold for another alleged crime in the Philippines – a violence against women and children (VAWC) charged filed against him. Another Japanese national, Imamura Kiyoto has a similar VAWC case filed against him and also had his deportation deferred. Tomonobu Saito and Fujita Toshiya are other suspects to the case. All four are suspected to be senior members of the group behind the Makati hotel fraud and extortion scheme busted back in 2019.

Activities
Criminal activity in Japan related to the Luffy robberies are believe to first began in the Japanse summer of 2021. No less than 50 incidents in 14 prefectures has been suspected to be linked with the Luffy group since that period. Watanabe, Kiyoto, Saito, Toshiya, the suspected ringleaders of the Luffy operation, are already under detention in the Philippines when they started their scheme.

With access to mobile phones, they recruited accomplices to Japan via social media. They offered "dark part-time jobs" for prospects in exchange for high financial compensation. They would relay instructions to gang members via the Telegram application. Accomplices would pose as police officers or Japan Financial Services Agency members and trick victims that their accounts has been compromised. They would aim to visit their victim's residences to steal their target's ATM cards and withdraw all the money in it.

Accomplices in Japan has been receiving instructions from individuals based in the Philippines under the names Luffy and Kim.

2023 deportations
On January 30, 2023, the government of Japan requested the Philippine government to deport the four suspects back to Japan. They first requested for the deportation back in 2019 but they have been held in the Philippines over separate criminal charges filed in Philippine courts.

Toshiya Fujita and Kiyoto Imamura were deported back to Japan on February 7, 2023 after their cases in the Philippines were dismissed. Yuki Watanabe and Tomonobu Saito were deported the following day.

The Department of Justice has coordinated with the Integrated Bar of the Philippines and the Bureau of Immigration to look into the previously pending cases against the four Japanese nationals which it suspects to be contrived cases filed to prevent their deportation back to Japan.

References

2021 crimes in Japan
2022 crimes in Japan
Fraud in Japan
Robberies in Japan
Prison-related crime
Transnational organized crime
Japan–Philippines relations